The Wanieso lizardfish (Saurida wanieso) or Wanieso saury, is a species of lizardfish that lives in the Indo-Pacific region.

Information
The Wanieso lizardfish can be found in a marine environment  within a demersal depth range. This species is native to a tropical climate. The maximum recorded length of this species as an unsexed male is about 65 centimeters or about 2.13 feet. This species has been recorded to weigh about 3.6 kilograms or about 7.937 pounds. The Wanieso lizardfish can be found on sandy bottoms within shallow water. This type of fish is used for diet for humans. People tend to use this fish for fish cakes and fish balls. The Wanieso lizardfish serves as no threat to humans and they are harmless. Humans use this species for fisheries and minor commercial uses. The Wanieso lizardfish can be identified by its elongated body that is brown with a white belly. It also has two rows of teeth on the anterior part of their teeth bands.

Common names
The common names for S. wanieso in different languages is as follows:
Mandarin Chinese : È shé zi
Korean : T'um-bil-mae-t'ung
English : Waneso lizardfish 
Wani-eso in Japanese (日本語)
Japanese : Wanieso lizardfish 
English : Wanieso saury
Mandarin Chinese : 鱷蛇鯔 
Mandarin Chinese : 鳄蛇鲻 
Korean : 툼빌매퉁이

References

Notes

External links
 Fishes of Australia : Saurida wanieso

Wanieso lizardfish
Marine fish of Northern Australia
Wanieso lizardfish